Wera Frydtberg (11 August 1926 – 16 June 2008) was a German film and television actress. She appeared in I Often Think of Piroschka (1955) Her best known film Wir Wunderkinder (known in English as Aren’t We Wonderful?) won the Golden Globe for the most successful International Picture in 1960 and the Golden Medal at the Moscow International Film Festival.

Biography 
Wera Frydtberg was born in Freiburg, Germany in 1926. She started her career in 1947 at the Stuttgart theatre and then moved to the Josefstadt theatre in Vienna. From 1951 she starred in 30 major films and over 100 television productions. She was the mother of historian Karina Urbach.

Selected filmography

References

External links

Bibliography 
 Goble, Alan. The Complete Index to Literary Sources in Film. Walter de Gruyter, 1999.

1926 births
2008 deaths
German film actresses
German television actresses
Actors from Freiburg im Breisgau